The Dog and Cat Meat Trade Prohibition Act of 2018, also called the DCMTPA, is a bipartisan bill outlawing the slaughter and trade of cats and dogs in the United States. It passed the House by voice vote on September 12, 2018. The Senate received it on September 17 and referred it to the Committee on Agriculture, Nutrition, and Forestry. It was passed by the Senate as part of the 2018 Farm Bill on December 11, 2018. The House passed the reconciled Farm Bill on December 12. On December 20, 2018, President Donald Trump signed it into law.

The law penalizes "the commercial Slaughter of cats and dogs with fines of up to $5,000". It prohibits shipping, sale and transportation of animals for the "purpose of slaughter for human consumption", except for Native American tribes performing religious ceremonies.

The bill was first introduced in March 2017 by Republican Representative Vern Buchanan and Democratic Representative Alcee Hastings. In November 2017, it passed the House Foreign Affairs Committee as part of an effort to encourage the end of the dog and cat meat trade in countries such as China, South Korea, Vietnam, and India.

The bill was promoted by animal welfare groups such as the Animal Hope and Wellness Foundation (AHWF), which saves animals from the meat trade around the world. Before the passage of the bill, the practice was rare but still legal in 44 states.

References

Acts of the 115th United States Congress
Dogs in the United States
Cats in the United States
Dog meat
Cruelty to animals